Paul Roger Amos (born 6 March 1975) is a Welsh actor and web series producer, currently based in Canada. He is most noted for his recurring role as Vex in the television series Lost Girl, and as the voice of Jacob Frye in the Assassin's Creed video game franchise.

Life and career
Amos was born in Pencoed, Wales. He went to the Welsh school Ysgol Gyfun Llanhari. Later he studied acting at the National Youth Theatre of Great Britain and the London Academy of Music and Dramatic Art (LAMDA). In 2005, he moved to Toronto, Canada. He now lives in Stratford, Ontario.

He married Danielle Brodhagen in 2016 and they have a daughter, Elloise.

Amos is a supporter of Welsh independence.

Filmography

References

External links
 

Living people
People from Bridgend County Borough
Welsh male film actors
Welsh male television actors
Welsh emigrants to Canada
Alumni of the London Academy of Music and Dramatic Art
National Youth Theatre members
1975 births